In the 2020–21 season, NC Magra is competing in the Ligue 1 for the 2nd season, as well as the League Cup. It is their 2nd consecutive season in the top flight of Algerian football. They competing in Ligue 1 and the League Cup. In its second season NC Magra signed a number of young players, and the goal was to ensure that they remained in the Ligue 1, and with the establishment of the League Cup competition, the club had ambitions and despite its involvement with large clubs, it was able to overcome it in the form of CS Constantine, CR Belouizdad and USM Alger. To reach the final of the first tournament in its history where he faced JS Kabylie and was defeated by penalty kicks.

Squad list
Players and squad numbers last updated on 15 November 2020.Note: Flags indicate national team as has been defined under FIFA eligibility rules. Players may hold more than one non-FIFA nationality.

Competitions

Overview

{| class="wikitable" style="text-align: center"
|-
!rowspan=2|Competition
!colspan=8|Record
!rowspan=2|Started round
!rowspan=2|Final position / round
!rowspan=2|First match	
!rowspan=2|Last match
|-
!
!
!
!
!
!
!
!
|-
| Ligue 1

|  
| 9th
| 28 November 2020
| 24 August 2021
|-
| League Cup

| Round of 16
| style="background:silver;"| Runners–up
| 20 April 2021
| 10 August 2021
|-
! Total

Ligue 1

League table

Results summary

Results by round

Matches
On 22 October 2020, the Algerian Ligue Professionnelle 1 fixtures were announced.

Algerian League Cup

Squad information

Playing statistics

|-
! colspan=10 style=background:#dcdcdc; text-align:center| Goalkeepers

|-
! colspan=10 style=background:#dcdcdc; text-align:center| Defenders

|-
! colspan=10 style=background:#dcdcdc; text-align:center| Midfielders

|-
! colspan=10 style=background:#dcdcdc; text-align:center| Forwards

|-
! colspan=10 style=background:#dcdcdc; text-align:center| Players transferred out during the season

Goalscorers
Includes all competitive matches. The list is sorted alphabetically by surname when total goals are equal.

Transfers

In

Out

References

2020-21
Algerian football clubs 2020–21 season